Rook Clift is a  biological Site of Special Scientific Interest east of South Harting in West Sussex. It is also a Special Area of Conservation.

A stream rises in this steep sided valley, which has semi-natural ancient woodland on its slopes. The canopy is dominated by a nationally scarce tree, large leaved lime, with other trees including beech and ash. The rich mollusc fauna includes Helicodonta obvoluta, which is a Red Data Book species.

References

Sites of Special Scientific Interest in West Sussex
Special Areas of Conservation in England
Forests and woodlands of West Sussex